William T. Tull House, also known as E.D. Long House, is a historic home located at Westover, Somerset County, Maryland. It is a two-story, three-bay, center passage/double-pile plan frame dwelling, erected around 1860.  Its exterior features are associated with the Greek Revival and Italianate styles.

It was listed on the National Register of Historic Places in 1996.

References

External links
, including photo from 1983, at Maryland Historical Trust

Houses in Somerset County, Maryland
Houses on the National Register of Historic Places in Maryland
Houses completed in 1860
Greek Revival houses in Maryland
Italianate architecture in Maryland
National Register of Historic Places in Somerset County, Maryland